Bermekimab (MABp1, trade name Xilonix) is a human monoclonal antibody of IgG1k isotype targeting Interleukin 1 alpha (IL1A). , bermekimab is in phase III clinical trials as an immunotherapy for colorectal cancer and as of September 2018 in phase II clinical trials for the treatment of atopic dermatitis.

Bermekimab is being developed by XBiotech Inc.

References 

Antibodies